The Equalizer is a 2014 American vigilante action film directed by Antoine Fuqua, loosely based on the 1980s TV series of the same title. Written by Richard Wenk, it stars Denzel Washington in the lead role, Marton Csokas, Chloë Grace Moretz, David Harbour, Bill Pullman and Melissa Leo. The film focuses on a former U.S. Marine turned DIA intelligence officer who reluctantly returns to action to protect a teenage prostitute from members of the Russian mafia. Principal photography began in June 2013 in Massachusetts. The Equalizer had its world premiere at 2014 Toronto International Film Festival on September 7, 2014, and was released worldwide on September 26, 2014, in conventional and IMAX theaters.

The film received mixed reviews from critics who praised the visual style, direction, cast performances, soundtrack and action sequences, but criticized its depictions of violence and plot. Nonetheless, it became a commercial success with a worldwide gross of over $192 million on a production budget of $55–73 million. A sequel was released on July 20, 2018, with Denzel Washington, Richard Wenk, and Antoine Fuqua returning. A third film is in production, with Washington and Fuqua returning.

Plot
Former marine-turned-DIA Operative Robert McCall lives a quiet life in Boston, where he works at a hardware store. He helps his colleague Ralphie train to become a security guard and, unable to sleep, often spends his nights reading at an all-night diner. There, he befriends Teri, a teenage prostitute trafficked by the Russian mob. The pair talk about Robert's books and, eventually, Teri shares that her real name is Alina and she dreams of being a singer.

One day Robert hears that Alina was badly beaten and is in hospital. He travels there and learns from her friend Mandy, another prostitute, that her pimp Slavi is responsible. 
Robert finds Slavi and his men at their restaurant and offers to buy Alina's freedom, which Slavi bluntly refuses. Robert expertly kills the men and leaves. 
Unbeknownst to Robert, Slavi and his men were part of a much larger syndicate led by Russian oligarch Vladimir Pushkin. Teddy Rensen, Pushkin's enforcer, arrives in Boston to investigate the attack. Aided by Boston PD detectives on Pushkin's payroll, Masters, Remar and Pederson, Teddy canvases rival gangs in the area, beating Irish mob lieutenant "Little" John Looney to death simply to send the message "I'm here."

Robert continues exacting vigilante justice on criminals he encounters, blackmailing two corrupt police officers to return racketeering money, and beating a gunman with a hammer after he robs the hardware store and steals co-worker Jenny's heirloom ring.
Teddy learns Robert's identity from Mandy, then murders her. He visits Robert at his apartment, posing as a police detective, but Robert sees through his guise. Teddy and the crooked detectives attempt twice to abduct Robert, but he evades them.

Robert travels to his friends and retired former DIA colleagues, Susan and Brian Plummer, asking Susan's help in identifying Rensen. She informs him that the five men he killed were a wing of Pushkin's operation, and that Rensen's real name is Nikolai Itchenko; he is a Spetsnaz operative, turned Russian secret police agent, and now an enforcer for Pushkin. She also informs him that Nikolai murdered Remar and Pederson and Masters has not been heard from in days.

Robert tracks Masters down and interrogates him, forcing him to turn himself in after shutting down one of Pushkin's money laundering warehouses and using evidence gathered by Masters to expose many of Pushkin's moles.
He confronts Nikolai again, threatening to do more damage if he persists in hunting him, and later destroys two of Pushkin's oil tankers.
Nikolai abducts Robert's co-workers at the hardware store and demands a trade. Robert arrives and kills the men guarding the hostages, setting them free. Ralphie stays behind to help Robert. Nikolai arrives with his men, whom Robert kills one by one with improvised weapons and traps. As Nikolai is about to kill Ralphie, Robert kills him with a nail gun.

Days later, Robert finds Pushkin at his Moscow Mansion, killing all of his guards and tricking Pushkin into electrocuting himself to death.
Returning home, Robert is found by Alina, now recovered and having found a job and started a new life with the money Robert anonymously gave her. She thanks him for his help.
Inspired to continue using his skills to help people in need, Robert posts online ads as The Equaliser.

Cast

In addition, Massachusetts-born and raised actors Robert Wahlberg and Timothy John Smith play the crooked Boston Police Department detectives extorting money from local shopkeepers.

Production
In June 2010, it was announced that Russell Crowe was trying to bring The Equalizer to the big screen directed by Paul Haggis, with Crowe intending to play Robert McCall.

In December 2011, it was reported that Denzel Washington would star in the title role of the film version, to be financed by Sony Pictures Entertainment and Escape Artists. Director Antoine Fuqua came on board to direct on March 21, 2013, reuniting him with Washington after their successful collaboration on the 2001 Oscar-winning film Training Day. Chloë Grace Moretz was announced as a co-star on May 10, 2013; Anna Kendrick, Kelly Macdonald and Nina Dobrev were also considered.

On May 31, 2013, Melissa Leo was cast in the film. Leo previously worked with Washington in the 2012 film Flight, and with Fuqua in Olympus Has Fallen (2013). Coincidentally, Leo actually guest starred in a season one episode of the original Equalizer television series titled "The Defector", in which she portrayed the daughter of a former Soviet agent, who enlists McCall's help to defect to the United States. Marton Csokas was cast to play the villain on May 17.

Filming began in June 2013 with locations in Salisbury, Hamilton, Chelsea, Haverhill, and Boston, Massachusetts.

On June 21, 2013, Harry Gregson-Williams was hired to compose the music for the film. Varèse Sarabande released a soundtrack album for The Equalizer on September 23, 2014.

The song "Guts Over Fear" by rapper Eminem featuring Sia, with production by Emile Haynie, premiered in trailers for the film. The song also plays over the closing credits.

Release

Promotion and marketing
The first official image from the film was released on December 6, 2013. On August 6, 2012, Sony had originally planned on an April 11, 2014 release date, but on July 5, 2013, the released date pushed back to September 26, 2014. The first official poster for the film was released on April 16, 2014. On April 22, USA Today revealed photos from the film. On May 24, the trailer for the film was released. On June 12, another official trailer for the film was released. On July 16, the IMAX poster for the film was released.

Theatrical release
The film had a premiere at the 2014 Toronto International Film Festival on September 7, 2014. Sony released the film in IMAX screen theaters worldwide on September 26, 2014.

Reception

Box office
The Equalizer grossed $101.5 million in North America and $90.8 million in other territories for a worldwide gross of $192.3 million, against a net production budget of $55 million.

The film was released on September 26, 2014, in the United States and earned $12.5 million from 3,236 theaters in its first opening night including the $1.45 million it earned from 2,693 screens from Thursday night showings. On the second day the film earned $13.5 million and $8.1 million on the third day. Its opening day is the third biggest for Washington, tailing behind American Gangster ($15.8 million) and Safe House ($13.6 million).

On its opening weekend the film earned $34,100,000 ($10,816 per theater) and debuted at number one at the box office. The film broke several records at the box office during its opening weekend including the biggest R-rated debut of September, surpassing Jackass Number Two record ($29 million), the biggest IMAX opener of September, the biggest debut weekend gross for Antoine surpassing Olympus Has Fallen ($30 million), the fifth biggest domestic opening for Washington behind the aforementioned American Gangster ($43.6 million), Safe House ($40.2 million), and eventually behind its sequel The Equalizer 2 ($35.8 million) and The Magnificent Seven ($35.7 million). It was also the fourth biggest for a film released in September. It earned $3.3 million from 352 IMAX theaters. Audiences for the debut weekend of the film were 52% male and 48% female, with 65% of ticket buyers over 30 years old.

The Equalizer earned $17.8 million overseas from 65 territories from 4,500 screens during its opening weekend with $1.4 million of the gross coming from 137 IMAX theaters. The film broke several September openings record in various territories including the UK, Netherlands, Israel, and Egypt. Top openings include the UK ($2.9 million), Russia ($2.7 million), Mexico ($1.4 million), Brazil ($1.3 million) United Arab Emirates ($875,000) and Malaysia ($650,000). Showings from Village Roadshow markets grossed an estimate $2.4 million with top openings including Australia ($1.9 million), New Zealand ($180,000) and Singapore ($300,000).

Critical response

 Rotten Tomatoes, - The Equalizer holds an approval rating of 60% based on 203 reviews, and an average rating of 7.0/10. The site's critical consensus reads, "The Equalizer is more stylishly violent than meaningful, but with Antoine Fuqua behind the cameras and Denzel Washington dispensing justice, it delivers."
 Metacritic - the film has a weighted average score of 57 out of 100, based on 41 critics, indicating "mixed or average reviews". 
 CinemaScore - gave the film an average grade of "A−" on an A+ to F scale.
 Roger Ebert - gave the film 3 stars stating "If "The Equalizer" lacks gravitas, it is fairly sturdy as far as pure entertainment goes" and "Basically, “The Equalizer” is an average-Joe blue-collar version of a comic-book avenger, secretly stalking those responsible for abusing and preying upon innocent citizens. And this film acts as an origin story with an ending that suggests a new franchise is afoot. It might not be bad for Washington to stay in the action game in a series that at least acknowledges those who qualify for a senior discount can be crusaders, too."
 Common Sense Media - gave an expert review of 3 star rating with parents and kids giving an average of 4 stars

Home media 
The Equalizer was released on Blu-ray and DVD on December 9, 2014, by Sony Pictures Home Entertainment. Later, it was released on Ultra HD Blu-ray on July 10, 2018, 10 days before the sequel was released in theaters.

Sequels

The Equalizer 2

On February 24, 2014, seven months before the release of the film, it was announced that Sony Pictures and Escape Artists were planning a sequel, with Richard Wenk penning the script. In early October 2014, Fuqua said in an interview that there would be a sequel to the film only if audiences and Denzel Washington wanted it. He stated McCall was an interesting character and that the sequel could have more of an international flavor. On April 22, 2015, Sony announced that a sequel would be made.

In July 2017, Columbia Pictures announced that a portion of the filming would take place in the Brant Rock area of Marshfield, which took place over two weeks in November 2017. The Equalizer 2 was released in the U.S. on July 20, 2018.

The Equalizer 3

In August 2018, Fuqua announced his plans to continue the film series. The filmmaker expressed interest in the plot taking place in an international setting.

By January 2022, a third film was officially confirmed to be in development, with Denzel Washington returning in the titular role. Fuqua will once again serve as director, while principal photography scheduled to commence some time in 2022, with Washington announcing that it would be the next movie he films. In June 2022, Dakota Fanning was cast in a supporting role. Written by Richard Wenk, the movie will be produced by Todd Black, Jason Blumenthal, Steve Tisch and Denzel Washington. The project will be a co-production between Sony Pictures, and Escape Artists Productions. The film is scheduled to be released theatrically on September 1, 2023.

References

External links
 
 
 
 
 

2014 films
2014 action thriller films
2014 crime thriller films
American action thriller films
American crime thriller films
2010s English-language films
Films about the Russian Mafia
Films based on television series
Films directed by Antoine Fuqua
Films produced by Mace Neufeld
Films produced by Denzel Washington
Films scored by Harry Gregson-Williams
Films set in Boston
Films set in Moscow
Films shot in Boston
Films shot in Massachusetts
Films with screenplays by Richard Wenk
IMAX films
American vigilante films
Columbia Pictures films
Village Roadshow Pictures films
Escape Artists films
The Equalizer
2010s American films
2010s vigilante films